Richard Lawrence Leonard (12 December 1930 – 24 June 2021) was a British writer, journalist and Labour politician who served as Member of Parliament (MP) for Romford from 1970 to 1974. He was a pro-European social democrat and had been a supporter of the late Labour foreign secretary Anthony Crosland, who championed Gaitskellism.

Early life and career 
Leonard was born in Pinner, Middlesex in December 1930, the son of the late Cyril Leonard, and Kate Leonard (née Whyte). He attended Ealing Grammar School, followed by the Institute of Education at London University, and the University of Essex, where he graduated with an MA degree. Leonard worked as a school teacher from 1953 to 1955, and from 1960 to 1968, as a journalist and broadcaster. Leonard was a senior research fellow (for the Social Science Research Council) at Essex University from 1968 to 1970.

Political career 
Leonard joined the Labour Party as a teenager in 1945. He was Deputy General Secretary of the Fabian Society, a Labour-affiliated think tank, from 1955 to 1960, and founded the organisation's youth wing, the Young Fabians, in 1960. He became a member of the executive committee of the Fabian Society in 1972, serving until 1980. He was also the Society's chairman from 1977 to 1978.

Leonard first stood for Parliament in 1955, when he contested Harrow West for Labour, a constituency which included his native Pinner. At the time, this was a safe seat for the Conservative Party, and he was thus unsuccessful in standing against their incumbent Member of Parliament, in an election which saw the Conservatives re-elected nationally. Fifteen years later, at the 1970 general election, he stood in the marginal Labour-held seat of Romford. Despite his party going into opposition, Leonard retained the seat. In Parliament, he introduced the Council Housing Bill in 1971, and the Life Peers Bill in 1973. During his time in the House of Commons, he was Parliamentary Private Secretary to Anthony Crosland. He was also a member of the Speaker's Conference on Electoral Law from 1972 to 1974. Leonard stood down at the subsequent February 1974 general election, when there were major changes made to his constituency boundaries, which saw Romford gained by the Conservatives, whilst Labour returned to power.

Later life and career 
He was a trustee for the Association of London Housing Estates from 1973 to 1978, and from 1978 to 1981, Chairman of the Library Advisory Council. From 1974 to 1985 he was Assistant Editor of The Economist. Leonard served as the Brussels and European Union correspondent in Brussels for The Observer (London) from 1989 to 1997. He was also the Brussels correspondent for Europe magazine from 1992 to 2003.

He remained in Brussels until 2009, and wrote on Belgian politics in The Bulletin. He also wrote on European affairs in The Guardian (London), the Financial Times, the Times Literary Supplement and European Voice. He had also contributed to Prospect magazine, and leading newspapers in the US, Canada, Japan, India, Australia and New Zealand. From 1987 to 1994, Leonard was a European Advisor to The Publishers Association.

He was a Visiting Professor at the Free University of Brussels from 1988 to 1996, and a Senior Adviser at the Centre for European Policy Studies from 1994 to 1999. In 2003, he became a Senior Research Associate at the Foreign Policy Centre in London.

Leonard had written or co-authored a number of books on contemporary and historical British politics, particularly focusing on Britain's prime ministers. His 2020 book British Prime Ministers from Walpole to Salisbury: The 18th and 19th Centuries was well received by fellow authors Patrick Diamond and David Marquand.

In later years, he had been critical of Britain's 2016 vote to leave the European Union and wanted Brexit to be reversed. In a 2018 letter to The Guardian, Leonard voiced his disapproval of Labour leader Jeremy Corbyn removing Owen Smith from the shadow cabinet, and urged Constituency Labour parties to put forward motions asking for a second referendum on Brexit.

In 2021, Leonard wrote to his local newspaper, the Camden New Journal, to say that whilst he would give his first preference vote in the London mayoral election to Labour's incumbent Sadiq Khan, he would be giving his second preference to Richard Hewison, a candidate standing under the slogan 'Rejoin EU: Brexit is broken'. Leonard stated that "it is important to keep alive the prospect of a long-time aspiration to which many adhere."

Personal life 
In 1963, Leonard married Irène Heidelberger-Leonard of Bad Godesberg, Germany, the daughter of the late Dr Ernst Heidelberger and Dr Gertrud Heidelberger. She is a scholar of postwar German literature, and the couple had two children: Mark Leonard, an expert on foreign policy, and Miriam Leonard, a classical scholar. He lived in Camden, north west London, and listed his recreations as "walking, book-reviewing, family pursuits".

Leonard died in June 2021 at the age of 90 and is buried on the eastern side of Highgate Cemetery.

Bibliography 

Guide to the General Election, Etc. United Kingdom, (n.p.), 1964.
Elections in Britain. Van Nost, London, Princeton, N.J., [etc.], 1968.

 Paying for party politics: The case for public subsidies, PEP Broadsheet No 555, 1975.
The BBC Guide to Parliament, British Broadcasting Corporation, United Kingdom, 1979. 
 (ed. with David Lipsey) The Socialist agenda: Crosland's legacy, Cape, London, 1981. 
 (with Richard Natkiel) World atlas of elections: Voting patterns in 39 democracies, Hodder & Stoughton, London, 1986. 
 (with Richard Lawrence) Pocket guide to the European Community, B. Blackwell, London, 1989. 
The Economist Guide to the European Community, 1992; 4th edn as The Economist Guide to the European Union, 1997; 9th edn 2005; 10th edn as Guide to the European Union: The definitive guide to all aspects of the EU, The Economist in association with Profile Books, London, 2009. 
Elections in Britain today: A guide for voters and students, 1991; 3rd edn, Macmillan, 1996. 
"Replacing the Lords" in The Political Quarterly, vol. 66 no. 4 (October–December 1995).
"Britain's indecision : from Macmillan to the referendum", chapter in Eminent Europeans (edited by Martyn Bond; Julie Smith; William Wallace), Greycoat Press, London, 1996.
 (ed.) Crosland and New Labour, Macmillan in association with the Fabian Society, 1999. 
 (with Roger Mortimore) Elections in Britain: A voter's guide, Palgrave, Basingstoke, 2001. 
 (ed. with Mark Leonard) The pro-European reader, Palgrave, Basingstoke, 2001. 
 A Century of Premiers: Salisbury to Blair, Macmillan, 2005. 

 (ed.) The future of socialism by Anthony Crosland, 50th anniv. edn, Constable, London, 2006. 
 Nineteenth-century premiers: Pitt to Rosebery, Palgrave Macmillan, 2008. 
 Eighteenth-Century British Premiers: Walpole to the Younger Pitt, Palgrave Macmillan, 2011. 
 The Great Rivalry: Gladstone and Disraeli, A Dual Biography, I. B. Tauris, London, 2013. . Publisher's page .
 A History of British Prime Ministers: Walpole to Cameron (omnibus edition), Palgrave Macmillan, 2014. . 2nd edn, 2015. 
(with Robert Taylor) The Routledge Guide to the European Union. United Kingdom, Taylor & Francis, 2016. 
 (with Mark Garnett) Titans: Fox vs. Pitt, Bloomsbury, 2019. . Publisher's page .
British Prime Ministers from Walpole to Salisbury, United States, Taylor & Francis, 2020. 
Modern British Prime Ministers: Balfour to Johnson, 2021.

Critical studies, reviews and biography
 Review of The great rivalry.

References

Notes

Sources

External links 
 
 
 "Tribute to a lifelong European" (Denis MacShane, 8 July 2021)  in The New European
 A Celebration of the Life and Work of Dick Leonard
 Dick Leonard obituary, The Times, 24 July 2021

1930 births
2021 deaths
Burials at Highgate Cemetery
Academics of the University of Essex
Alumni of the UCL Institute of Education
Chairs of the Fabian Society
English male journalists
English male non-fiction writers
English non-fiction writers
Labour Party (UK) MPs for English constituencies
People educated at Ealing County Grammar School for Boys
People from Pinner
UK MPs 1970–1974